State of Divinity is a Taiwanese television series adapted from Louis Cha's novel The Smiling, Proud Wanderer. It was first broadcast on CTV in Taiwan in 2000.

Cast

 Richie Ren as Linghu Chong
 Anita Yuen as Ren Yingying
 Vivian Chen as Yue Lingshan
 Leanne Liu as Dongfang Bubai
 David Chiang as Qu Yang
 Norman Chui as Xiang Wentian
 Chang Fu-chien as Liu Zhengfeng
 Ku Kuan-chung as Zuo Lengshan
 Lee Li-chun as Ren Woxing
 Ma Chi-chin as Dingyi
 Sun Xing as Tian Boguang
 Chu Chung-heng as Lu Dayou
 Tsai Tsan-te as Yilin
 Song Ta-ming as Lin Pingzhi
 Li Chih-hsi as Yang Lianting
 Tieh Meng-chiu as Lüzhuweng
 Chang Li-wei as Peach Flower Immortal
 Yu Wen-chung as Feng Qingyang
 Chen Baoguo as Lin Zhennan
 Yue Yaoli as Yue Buqun
 Liu Li-li as Ning Zhongze
 Pan Hung as Yu Canghai
 Chen Zihan as Lan Fenghuang
 Tu Peng as Lao Denuo
 Liu Jia as Lin Zhennan's wife
 Ch'ang Ju-yen as Dingxian
 K'ung Ching-shan as Peach Leaf Immortal
 Liu Ch'ang-sheng as Fangzheng
 Hsia Te-sheng as Elder Monk
 Yuen Hung-chi as Shangguan Yun
 Chao Wen-liang as Huang Zhonggong
 Hou Chun as Heibaizi
 Tsao Pao-yeh as Tubiweng
 Wu Chen-su as Danqingsheng
 He Chiang as Mu Gaofeng
 Wang Chien-hung as Lan Yi
 Li Hung-wei as Zhong Zhen
 Sun Nien-pin as Adviser Yi
 Lo Cheng-yen as Wang Yuanba
 Chao Kai as Wang Jiajun
 Fu Hung-chin as Zu Qianqiu
 Tang Yung-te as Laotouzi
 Wang Piao as Long-haired Monk
 Yen Mei as Single-eyed Woman
 Fu Hui as You Xun

External links

Works based on The Smiling, Proud Wanderer
2000 Taiwanese television series debuts
Taiwanese wuxia television series
Television series set in Imperial China
2000s Taiwanese television series
Television shows based on works by Jin Yong